Scott Weston Terra (born June 25, 1987) is an American former actor perhaps best known for his role as Mike Parker of the 2002 film Eight Legged Freaks and Young Matthew Murdock in the 2003 film Daredevil. Terra also played Sam Finney in Dickie Roberts: Former Child Star.

Filmography
’’ power rangers time force ’’(2001)-young boy
Spin City (1996), episode "Miracle Near 34th Street" (aired Dec 17, 1997) - Justin
One Zillion Valentines (1998), animated short film - voice of MiltonShadrach (1998) - PaulBeverly Hills, 90210 (1990), episode "I Wanna Reach Right Out and Grab Ya" (aired April 13, 1999) - Peter FoleyCharmed (1999), episode "Out of Sight" (aired May 5, 1999) - DavidTouched by an Angel (1994), episode "The Occupant", (aired Oct 13, 1999) - Lonnie at 10The Perfect Nanny (2000) - Ben LewisGoing Home (2000) (TV) - Dylan
 Then Came You (2000), pilot episode "Then Came You" (aired March 22, 2000) - Small BoyGround Zero (2000) - Justin Stevenson
 Strong Medicine (2000), episode "Dependency" (aired Oct 8, 2000) - David Tyrell7th Heaven (1996), three episodes, aired in May 2000 & Feb 2001 - Bert MillerMotocrossed (2001) (TV) - Jason CarsonThe Sons of Mistletoe (2001) (TV) - Wylie ArmstrongProvidence (1999). episode "Shadow Play" (Jan 11, 2002) - Ethan O`BrienRedemption of the Ghost (2002) - JackEight Legged Freaks (2002) - Mike ParkerDaredevil (2003) - young Matthew MurdockDickie Roberts: Former Child Star (2003) - Sam FinneyNotes from the Underbelly'' (2006)

References

External links

1987 births
American male child actors
American male film actors
Male actors from Connecticut
Living people